The Mayor of Barnstaple together with the Corporation long governed the historic Borough of Barnstaple, in North Devon, England. The seat of government was the Barnstaple Guildhall. The mayor served a term of one year and was elected annually on the Feast of the Assumption of the Virgin (15 August) by a jury of twelve. However Barnstaple was a mesne borough and was held by the Mayor and Corporation in chief not from the king but from the feudal baron of Barnstaple, later known as the lord of the "Castle Manor" or "Castle Court". The Corporation tried on several occasions to claim the status of a "free borough" which answered directly to the monarch and to divest itself of this overlordship, but without success. The mayor was not recognised as such by the monarch, but merely as the bailiff of the feudal baron. The powers of the borough were highly restricted, as was determined by an inquisition ad quod damnum during the reign of King Edward III (1327–1377), which from an inspection of evidence found that members of the corporation elected their mayor only by permission of the lord, legal pleas were held in a court at which the lord's steward, not the mayor, presided, that the borough was taxed by the county assessors, and that the lord held the various assizes which the burgesses claimed. Indeed, the purported ancient royal charter supposedly granted by the Anglo-Saxon King Æthelstan (d.939) (King of the Anglo-Saxons from 924 to 927 and King of the English from 927 to 939) and held by the corporation, from which it claimed its borough status, was suspected to be a forgery.

Since 1974 Barnstaple has been a civil parish governed by a town council.

List of mayors
An incomplete list of the mayors of Barnstaple between 1303 and 1793, was compiled by Benjamin Incledon (1730–1796) of Pilton House, Pilton, near Barnstaple in North Devon, an antiquarian and genealogist, and was published in 1830 within Joseph Besly Gribble's work "Memorials of Barnstaple". A list of mayors from 1301 to 2002 was more recently published in Lois Lamplugh's 2002 work Barnstaple: Town on the Taw.

List

The following were mayors of Barnstaple, Devon, England:

1406 Thomas Holman 
1407–12 Thomas Hooper
1413 Thomas Walsh
1414–19 Thomas Hooper
1420 Thomas Holman
1421–22 Thomas Hooper
1423 William Hertescott
1424 Thomas Hertescott
1425 William Hertescott
1426 John Goldsmith
1427 Thomas Hooper
1428 John Goldsmith
1429 Thomas Hooper
1430 John Goldsmith
1431 Richard Bowden
1432 William Hertescott
1433 William Bedwin
1434 Richard Bowden
1435 John Hutchen
1436 William Hertescott
1437 William Bowden
1438 William Rowe
1439 John Mules
1440 Richard Bowden
1441 John Mules
1442 Richard Norris
1443 William Bedwin
1444 John Mules
1445 Walter Hayman
1446 Richard Rowe
1447 Walter Hayman
1448 William Hertescott
1449 Richard Newcombe
1450 John Widon
1451 Nicholas Bovey
1452 William Upcott
1453 Richard Pickard
1454 John Widger
1455 Walter Gaynock
1456 William Charnier
1457 Walter Gaynock
1458 Richard Newcombe
1459 John Widger
1460 John Bowdon
1461 John Smith
1462 John Collins
1463 John Widger
1464 John Collins
1465 John Widger
1466 John Bowden
1467 John Widger
1468 John Pugsley
1469 John Bowden
1470 John Widger
1471 John Squire
1472 John Widger
1473 Philip Stigan
1474 John Pugsley
1475 John Collins
1476 John Hart
1477 Philip Stigan
1478 John Branton
1479 John Bowden
1480 Thomas White
1481 John Hart
1482 Richard Crews
1483 Robert Symons
1484 John Smith
1485 Walter Nicholls
1486 William Dallington
1487 William Hart
1488 Philip Warington
1489 Robert Symons
1490 John Salisbury
1491 William Dallington
1492 Roger Colmer
1493 John Smith
1494 Robert Symons
1495 Arthur Merryfield
1496 John Salisbury
1497 Roger Colmer
1498 Richard Parminter
1499 William Cosby
1500 John Salisbury
1557-8: William Salusbury.
1607: Richard Beaple (1564–1643)
1611: Pentecost Dodderidge
1620: John Penrose (1575-1624)
1621: Richard Beaple (1564–1643)
1627: Pentecost Dodderidge
1629: Gilbert Paige (c.1590–1647)
1632: Richard Ferris (1582–1649) (1st of 2 terms)
1635: Richard Beaple (1564–1643)
1640: Thomas Horwood (1600–1658)
1641: Gilbert Paige (c.1590–1647)
1646: Richard Ferris (1582–1649) (2nd of 2 terms)
1637: Pentecost Dodderidge
1650: Thomas Matthew
1653: Thomas Horwood (1600–1658)
1667: Thomas Matthew
1712: Robert Incledon
1721: Robert Incledon
1902-03: H. Barrett, Liberal

References

 
Barnstaple